The FIS Junior Ski Jumping World Championships 2009 (JWSC) (part of 2009 Nordic Junior World Ski Championships) is a ski jumping World Championship for juniors (age 15–20). It took place in Strbske Pleso, Slovakia, from February 2 until February 8, 2009. The competition took place on Strbske Pleso's MS 1970 B-hill which has a hill size of 100 meters, and the k-point at 90 meters. The hill record as of February 7, 2009, was 101.5 meters and held by Russian Roman Trofimov in 2008.

Results

Ladies individual competition

Winner - Magdalena Schnurr 
2nd place - Anna Haefele 
3rd place - Coline Mattel  
4th place - Naata de Leeuw 
5th place - Jacqueline Seifriedsberger

Men's individual competition
Winner - Lukas Müller 
2nd place - Maciej Kot 
3rd place - Ville Larinto 
4th place - Pascal Bodmer 
5th place - Čestmír Kožíšek

Men's team competition

Winner - Austria 
2nd place - Germany 
3rd place - Poland

References

External links
Start List: Ladies Individual Competition
Start List: Men's Individual Competition

2009 in ski jumping
Ski jumping competitions
World youth sports competitions
Jumping
Sport in Prešov Region